Rajesh Kumar Mishra may refer to :

Rajesh Kumar Mishra (born 1950), an Indian National Congress politician from Varanasi, India
Rajesh Kumar Mishra (born 1967), a Bharatiya Janata Party politician from Bareilly district, India.